Kirkcaldy Burghs was a burgh constituency of the House of Commons of the Parliament of the United Kingdom (Westminster) from 1832 to 1974. It elected one Member of Parliament (MP) by the first-past-the-post voting system. From 1832 to 1950 it was, officially, a district of burghs constituency.

Boundaries

1885–1918
Comprising Kirkcaldy, Burntisland, Dysart, Kinghorn and the Municipal Burgh of Kirkcaldy not included in the old Parliamentary Burgh (except that portion within the Parliamentary Borough of Dysart).

1918–1949
The burghs of Kirkcaldy, Buckhaven, Methil and Innerleven, Burntisland, Dysart and Kinghorn.

Members of Parliament

Election results 1832–1885

Elections in the 1830s

Elections in the 1840s
Ferguson's death caused a by-election.

Elections in the 1850s

Elections in the 1860s
Ferguson resigned, causing a by-election.

Elections in the 1870s

Reid's death caused a by-election.

Elections in the 1880s

Election results 1885–1918

Elections in the 1880s

Elections in the 1890s

Elections in the 1900s

Elections in the 1910s

Election results 1918–1949

Elections in the 1910s

Elections in the 1920s

Elections in the 1930s

Elections in the 1940s

Election results 1950–1973

Elections in the 1950s

Elections in the 1960s

Elections in the 1970s

References 

Historic parliamentary constituencies in Scotland (Westminster)
Constituencies of the Parliament of the United Kingdom established in 1832
Constituencies of the Parliament of the United Kingdom disestablished in 1974
Politics of Fife